Biriwal Bulga National Park is an Australian national park in New South Wales.  It is approximately 45 km north west of Taree and 60 km west of Port Macquarie on the Bulga Plateau. 

The national park contains biodiverse ecosystems as well as culturally significant Indigenous Australian sites. The residents of the park range from animals to trees and bushes. The animals reside in an escarpment terrain. The park's soil varies in depth depending on the slope. There is a higher than average amount of annual rainfall which attributes to the types of native plants found. 

There are different conservation and management plans in place to maintain the natural and cultural heritage of the park whilst also providing research opportunities for visitors. The plans are set out and authorised by NSW National Parks and Wildlife Services. Some plans include conservation regions for koalas and plants, limiting the spread and influence of pests and prevention of potential bushfires.

Etymology and indigenous heritage 
The name Biriwal Bulga originates from the Indigenous Birpai or Biripi people who have resided in the area for over 15,000 years. The Indigenous Australians in the local neighbourhood speak the Birpai language. The language spoken by the tribes surrounding the Birpai people is Gadjang.

Campsites and artifacts found within the park indicate the habitation of Indigenous Australians within the area. Truyard Pty. Ltd estimated that originally anywhere from 800 to 1000 Indigenous Australians inhabited in the national park and surrounding regions. The people were dispersed throughout the land in smaller clan groups, with the most prominent being the Winmurra people.

History 
Exploration occurred initially in the surrounding areas of Biriwal Bulga in the 1800s after European settlement. It wasn't until 1982 when settlers began making discoveries within the park. The date of the first discoveries, mark Biriwal Bulga National Park as one of the latest National Parks to be discovered in the Port Macquarie region. Originally the park was a part of the 

In the early 1900s, Bulga State Forest Area was predominantly utilised for timber harvesting and logging operations. This resulted in the implementation of a pine plantation within the National Park. In 1990, the State government placed a moratorium on further harvesting to ensure survival of the ecosystem. This resulted in the area shifting from Bulga State Forest Area to a conservation national park known today as Biriwal Bulga.

Region description 
Biriwal Bulga is a 5813-hectare national park  on the northern edge of the Bulga plateau. It ranges in elevation from 130m to 670m. The  landform is predominantly dissected foothills, which contribute to its elevation. The most common rocks  are mudstone and shale. Its average rainfall during the year ranges from 1300-1600mm. If there is vegetation cover over the land, the rainfall can potentially cause erosion of soil.

The park has few visitors due to its remote location and lack of accessibility for two-wheel drive cars and bike tracks. There are no facilities or walking trails within the national park. The nearest recreational facilities are at Tapin Tops National Park and Ellenborough Falls at Elands.

Weelah Nature Reserve 
Weelah Nature Reserve is situated in the south-east of Biriwal Bulga National Park, covering an area of 37 ha. It contains one of the few rainforest remnants on the Bulga Plateau.

Biology and ecology

Fauna 

Seventy-four fauna species have been recorded in the area. Amongst these seventy-four species; according to NSW National Parks and Wildlife Service,“the following are recorded as vulnerable and at risk of becoming endangered: powerful owl, glossy black cockatoo, fruit doves, spotted-tailed quoll, brush-tailed phascogale, yellow-bellied glider, koala, long-nosed potoroo, large bent-wing bat”. The most common are koalas. There different sub-species of koalas which interact with the natural flora forming the ecosystem within the park. These sub-species often roam and move from neighbouring regions into the park. An estimated 500-1000 individual koalas are recorded throughout the Biriwal Bulga region.

Flora 
Sixteen types of plants have been recorded within Biriwal Bulga National Park. The predominant plants are dry sclerophyll forests. During its early discovery, the park was subject to selective logging for businesses due to its dense forests. The logging caused forest destruction and disturb the natural ecosystem of the park.

The 1950s brought an end to all logging in the parkand since, the majority of forest has been restored. The Central Eastern Rainforest Reserves of Australia (CERRA) World Heritage Area has identified the park as a potential addition to its list as a development listing due to its undisturbed and intact rainforest. As of 2004, there were no recorded threatened plant species.  Plectranthus suaveolens is listed as the only rare plant found. The plants listed as endangered by the NSW Wildlife Services are vine (Cynanchum elegans) and ground orchid  (Diuris flavescens).

Catchment 
Biriwal Bulga National Park drains the majority of its rainfall into surrounding creeks which eventually lead to the Hastings River. The main nearby body of water is the Doyles River, which is approximately 6 km in length. This is found on the south-eastern border of the park. Inside the park are two catchments of water, Green Gully Creek and Big Creek. The water that leaves the park supplies stock on some downstream farms and partially supplies Port Macquarie.

Environmental threats

Pests 
Biriwal Bulga national park contains different animals, some of which are considered pests and disturb the natural ecosystem of the park. The pests sighted within the area are wild dogs, foxes, pigs and cats. The most prevalent danger are wild dogs, in particular, dingoes. Dingoes pose threats to the native koala population within the national park. Their speed allows them to track and hunt koalas that have left their trees. Foxes and pigs are also a concern for the park's natural catchment. The pests’ movement throughout the park can cause damage to the soil. This can lead to increase in erosion which cause dirt to be run-off along with the water to the park's neighbouring catchments.

In addition to animal pests, there are also plants and weeds which threaten to damage the habitat. In 1968–1969, a pine plantation plot was established as a trial for future pine plantation programs on the plateau. These pine trees have started to disperse to the surrounding areas outside their original allocation. This can cause problems if left uncontrolled as it damages the natural ecosystem of the park. There are also a number of pest plants which have invaded into the park from the neighbouring Yarras Mountain Trail. The most common of which is known as the lantana.

Fires 
Due to the areas densely covered forest, the park is susceptible to fires. These fire pose as a threat to the wet sclerophyll communities which are abundant in the park. The fires have the capability to burn the rainforest and threaten the biodiversity within the park if they occur regularly. The main type fire  is vegetation fire, most commonly known as bushfire.

Biriwal Bulga National Park was one of the areas affected by the 2019-2020 bushfire season in Australia. The fire burned during the periods of mid-December to mid-January. The torrential rain and large thunderstorms helped firefighters to contain the spread throughout the park.

Bacteria 
Within the National Park, there are some bacteria  that pose potential problems to the wildlife which inhabit it. A  bacterium pathogen dangerous to the wildlife, in particular koalas is: Chlamydia pecorum. This pathogen is an infectious disease which harms koalas and potentially could cause fatality. It is dangerous due to the ease of which it spreads from animals to animals. As koalas, move regularly from neighbouring regions into the national park, the spread of this disease is apparent in the park. There are management plans in place to restrict the influence of bacteria on the koala population within the park.

Management 
Biriwal Bulga National Park is recognised as a significantly cultural land to Indigenous Australians. Any discussion in plans of conservation must be directly consulted with a member of the Biripi people The Biripi people must be involved in negotiations of plans in order to maintain the Aboriginal heritage within the park. Currently there are nine recognised sites in Biriwal Bulga that are significant to the local Indigenous population. A further two potential significant sites are being investigated with the help of the Indigenous community around Biriwal Bulga.

The issues of pests within the park has been identified by the NPWS Mid-North Coast regional pest management. They have included strategies such as preparing a mapping of areas within the park that display high activities of pest animals and plants. This allows for wildlife services to control the growth of pests, ensuring that they are kept only within those area. The maps allow for services to plan for conservation sites and ensure that native species have minimal interactions with pests. There is a focus on park services to help control the pines surrounding the plantation area. This is to ensure the prevention of weed spreading into the natural habitat.

Biriwal Bulga is recognised as a conservation site for koalas. The terrain and environment surrounding the park provide stability for steady growth of the koala population. The national park's lack of human visitors allows for the koalas to live peacefully and undisturbed. Research and surveys are suggested to be conducted to ensure that the growth of koalas is being monitored. This is to ensure that koalas are not at risk of the potential bacteria that could cause a decrease in population.

Biriwal Bulga's dense forest are a concern for the bushfire seasons which occur in Australia. To preserve the national park's habitat, back-burning is a method that prevents fires from destroying the ecosystem. The NSW National Parks and Wildlife Services attempts to establish strong communication with the local Rural Fire Services to ensure a fire free interval of land is maintained every 10 to 15 years.

To implement all the management plans mentioned above, easier access into the national park is required. The NSW wildlife service's plan to negotiate with relevant neighbours of the park for the development of safety tracks to ensure for easier access into the park. If this occurs, the park wishes to establish guidelines to ensure that visitors will not disturb the local ecosystem.

NSW wildlife service's plans to promote Biriwal Bulga as a remote location that offers visitors the experience to be self-reliant in nature. Facilities will not be developed and instead visitors will be encouraged to use the facilities offered by surrounding areas. This encouragement can be done through signs within the park or uploading information onto the  park's website. Services plan to monitor activities of visitors to ensure that they are following guidelines set up to ensure for safety of both visitors and the park. Suggestions for monitoring activities include surveys of how many utilise the park as well as observing whether occupants have left belongings behind such as valuables or rubbish.

See also
 Protected areas of New South Wales

References

National parks of New South Wales
Protected areas established in 1999
1999 establishments in Australia